Giovanni Battista Baliani (1582–1666) was an Italian mathematician, physicist and astronomer.

Career
He was born in Genoa. He was governor of Savona in 1647–1649 and captain of the Republic of Genoa's archers. For some 25 years, he held a correspondence with Galileo Galilei about the time's most innovative scientific theories and experiments.

Work
At Savona, from the Priamar Fortress, he repeated Galileo's experiment of the Tower of Pisa, obtaining more precise measurements which allowed him to underline the effect of air attrition. He also conducted an experiment to show the heat generated by a pot full of water, which he had boiled after rotating it at high speed.

His main work is entitled De motu naturali gravium, fluidorum et solidorum ("About the motion of bodies, fluids and solids"), published in 1638; in it, he was the first to enunciate the law of acceleration of a body and to distinguish between mass and weight. He also studied tides, supporting Galileo's theory that they were generated by the Earth's motion around the Sun. His arguments were published by Giovanni Battista Riccioli in his Almagestum novum (1651) and later resumed by John Wallis and Isaac Newton.

Death

Baliani died at Genoa in 1666.

Notes

Sources

External links
 

1582 births
1666 deaths
17th-century Genoese people
17th-century Italian mathematicians
17th-century Italian writers
17th-century Italian physicists
17th-century Italian astronomers